Alan Gibbs (born 1939) is a New Zealand-born businessman, entrepreneur and art collector. After a successful business career in New Zealand, which made him one of that country's wealthiest individuals, he relocated to London in 1999. He retains strong links to New Zealand through his development of Gibbs Farm, one of the world's leading sculpture parks. He is the founder of Gibbs Amphibians, based in Detroit, Michigan, Nuneaton, UK, and Auckland, New Zealand, which pioneers high-speed amphibious vehicle technologies.

Early life
Alan Gibbs was born in Christchurch, the son of Theodore Nisbet Gibbs and Elsie Gibbs. His father was an accountant, tax adviser and businessman. He was chairman of a 1951 Royal Commission on Taxation. The family moved to Wellington in 1947 and Alan attended Wadestown Primary School, Wellesley College and Wellington College. He undertook three out of four years of an engineering degree at Canterbury University, before switching to economics, completing a BA in 1961. The following year he gained an MA in economics from Victoria University of Wellington.

New Zealand business career
Gibbs went to London in 1963 as Third Secretary in the New Zealand High Commission, returning to New Zealand in 1965 to work in the Prime Minister's department. He left soon after with a dream to build what he promoted as the first New Zealand car, the Anziel Nova. In New Zealand's then highly regulated economy he failed to gain the necessary import licences to build the cars, and abandoned the scheme in 1970 after a four-year battle. Gibbs then moved to Sydney for two years, where he worked as a merchant banker, returning to set up the Chase-NAB merchant bank in Auckland in 1972. After an early retirement in 1975, he established Gibbs, Saint and Co. in 1977, specialising in corporate advisory work. This later became Gibbs Securities Ltd. 
 
Gibbs' career took off in 1979 when, with three other investors, he purchased Tappenden Motors Ltd. They liquidated it profitably over the next few years. Gibbs then gained stakes in Atlas Majestic Industries, Bendon and Ceramco, three prominent New Zealand public companies which he merged in 1986 and 1987 and that was liquidated in 1989. Meantime, in 1985 he and Trevor Farmer made a successful $114 million takeover bid for the publicly listed transport and security company Freightways Ltd. In early 1990 the Fourth Labour Government confirmed it would sell the Telecom Corporation of New Zealand. Together with merchant banker David Richwhite, Gibbs brokered the $4.25 billion winning bid for the company, which when subsequently floated became the largest company on the New Zealand Stock Exchange. As part of the deal, Gibbs became a director and he and Farmer took a 5 per cent holding in the company. Following a second round of restructuring, led by Gibbs, this holding proved very valuable.

Also in 1990 Gibbs and Farmer invested in and worked with Craig Heatley to develop Sky TV, New Zealand's first pay television company. Gibbs sold most of his New Zealand assets in the late 1990s, retaining Gibbs Farm and an interest in Viaduct Harbour Holdings, the owner of a new waterfront precinct in downtown Auckland and a property portfolio in Wellington with Andrew Wall.

Political activism
Having been a member of the New Left Club at Canterbury University, Gibbs had converted to strongly-held free-market views by the late 1970s. He became a strong supporter of Roger Douglas, the Minister of Finance in the reforming Fourth Labour Government, 1984–90. Gibbs was appointed chairman of the NZ Forestry Corporation, which in 1987 corporatised the old New Zealand Forest Service. The loss-making department was restructured and transformed into a profitable State Owned Enterprise. He was also appointed chairman of the Hospital and Related Services Taskforce, with a brief to recommend reforms for the underperforming public hospital service. Their suggestions, which focused on introducing an internal market into the system, were not taken up by the Labour government but were partially implemented by the next National Government.

Gibbs also founded the Centre for Independent Studies in New Zealand and was an active member of the New Zealand Business Roundtable. He is a member of the Mont Pelerin Society, founded by the Austrian economist Friedrich Hayek. Gibbs was active in the establishment of ACT New Zealand, a libertarian political party that was formed in 1994. ACT won seven seats in the parliament after the first election under proportional representation in 1996, and has continued to be represented in Parliament since.

Art and sculpture collection at Gibbs Farm

Among the art works installed on The Farm are monumental pieces by contemporary artists including Daniel Buren, Neil Dawson, Marijke de Goey, Andy Goldsworthy, Anish Kapoor, George Rickey, Richard Serra and Bernar Venet.

High speed amphibians

Frustrated by the extreme tidal nature of the Kaipara Harbour, that forms the western boundary of his farm, Gibbs began experimenting with amphibious vehicles in the early 1990s. In 1997 he began to develop the concept in Detroit. Gibbs relocated the project to the United Kingdom in 1999. He partnered with Neil Jenkins who became CEO and based the operation at Nuneaton. Over the next four years they developed the concept to the point that the Aquada, the world's first road-legal, high-speed amphibian, was shown to the public in September 2003. In June 2004 Richard Branson drove an Aquada to break the record for an amphibious crossing of the English Channel. In 2007 a new division of the business was set up in Detroit. A major R & D program has been undertaken in Auckland since 2004. Two new high-speed amphibians, the Humdinga and the Phibian, were released in Washington in 2012, and a third, the Quadski, arrived on the market in early 2013.

Honours and awards
In 2018, Gibbs was inducted into the New Zealand Business Hall of Fame.

Personal
Gibbs was married to Jennifer Gore (now Dame Jenny Gibbs) for 33 years. They have three daughters, Amanda, Debbi and Emma, and one son, Thane.

References

Books and media 
 "Seeing the Landscape: Richard Serra's Te Tuhirangi Contour", documentary film by Alberta Chu, 2003.
 "New Form at the Farm: Anish Kapoor's Dismemberment Site 1", documentary film by Alberta Chu, 2010.

External links

Gibbs Farm – website with photos of artwork
Gibbs Amphibians
 Gibbs Sports Amphibians, information about vehicles
The Incredible Sculptures of Gibbs Farm - photos and text of Gibbs Farm art

A Great Day Out at the Farm many photos, articles about the Farm and its art and open house event
, large photos of large art at the Farm
Farm Directory, brochure with information about art works

1939 births
20th-century New Zealand businesspeople
20th-century New Zealand inventors
New Zealand art collectors
People from Christchurch
People educated at Wellington College (New Zealand)
University of Canterbury alumni
Victoria University of Wellington alumni
Living people
People educated at Wellesley College, New Zealand